Najiang Town is an urban town in Chaling County, Hunan Province, People's Republic of China.

Cityscape
The town is divided into 19 villages and 1 community, the following areas: Majiang Community, Changyuan Village, Hongqi Village, Changlian Village, Motou Village, Tangfu Village, Dongchong Village, Xichong Village, Mayuan Village, Maojia Village, Jingquan Village, Xiaobi Village, Yueling Village, Mashi Village, Xuanwu Village, Gaoyuan Village, Zenghu Village, Dengping Village, Langtan Village, and Lianhu Village.

References

External links

Divisions of Chaling County